Gael Suares (born 9 April 1981 in Paris, France) is a French footballer who played 2 matches in Ligue 1 for SM Caen in the 2004–2005 season and 28 matches in Ligue 2 for Caen in the period 2000–2004.

References

1981 births
Living people
Footballers from Paris
Stade Malherbe Caen players
Association football defenders
French footballers
21st-century French people